Norbrook is a United Kingdom-based pharmaceutical company. It was founded in 1969 by Lord Ballyedmond as Norbrook Laboratories Ltd in Northern Ireland. In 1970, Norbrook began manufacturing of veterinary pharmaceuticals. In 2011 the Norbrook Group was listed by the Belfast Telegraph in its Top 100 Companies list as being in position 28.

Norbrook manufactures several pharmaceutical drugs, the best-known of which are the antibiotic drugs Noroclav and Betamox, NSAIDs such as Carprieve, Loxicom and Flunixin.

Veterinary products 
Closamectin – Closamectin is a pioneer drug developed by Norbrook for the treatment of fluke, worms and other external parasites.
Carprieve – A nonsteroidal anti-inflammatory drug (NSAID) for the treatment of osteoarthritis in dogs.
Loxicom oral Suspension – A nonsteroidal anti-inflammatory drug (NSAID) for the treatment of pain in cats and dogs.
Loxicom Injectable – A nonsteroidal anti-inflammatory drug (NSAID) for the treatment of pain in cats and dogs, scour in cattle, musculo-skeletal and locomotary conditions in horses and pigs.
Noroclav
Flunixin –  A nonsteroidal anti-inflammatory drug (NSAID) used in horses, cattle and swine in different parts of the world.
Peptizole - First generic omeprazole for Equine gastric ulcer syndrome in the UK.
Vetofol
Thyronorm - First oral solution for treating hyperthyroidism in cats

Awards
 1987 Norbrook receives its first Queens Award for Export
 2002 Norbrook receives the Queens Award for Export Achievement for the fourth time
 2011 Norbrook receives the Queens Award for Enterprise
 Norbrook is the only company in the world which is licensed by the United States Food and Drugs Administration to manufacture sterile injections for veterinary use outside the USA and import them for sale in USA territory.

References

External links

Brands of Northern Ireland
Pharmaceutical companies established in 1969
Manufacturing companies of Northern Ireland
Pharmaceutical companies of the United Kingdom
Veterinary medicine in the United Kingdom